Hans Christian Ondrup (1751-1814), usually referred to as H.C. Ondrup, was a Danish master builder, stucco artist and porcelain painter. He constructed a number of buildings in Copenhagen in the 1780s and 1800s, most of which have now been listed on the Danish registry of protected buildings and places.

Biography
Ondrup was born in Copenhagen. He worked as a porcelain painter at the Royal Porcelain Manufactury in 1673 and completed an apprenticeship as a stucco artist in 1779. He became a member of the Masons' Guild in 1783 and became a master mason in 1789.

Selected buildings
Ondrup  has constructed the following buildings in Copenhagen:
 Dronningens Tværgade 5, Copenhagen (1793-1794, with A. Gjedde)
 Dronningens Tværgade 7  (1794, with A. Gjedde) 
 Dronningens Tværgade 9  (1794, with A. Gjedde)
 Gammel Strand 52/Naboløs 5  (1797–98)
 Knabrostræde 15  (1797–98)
 Naboløs 1  (1798–99)
 Naboløs 3  (1798)
 Rosengården 9  (1811-1812)

References

External links
Hans Christian Ondrup at Kunstindeks Danmark

1751 births
18th-century Danish architects
18th-century Danish artisans
1814 deaths
Danish architects
Artisans from Copenhagen